The men's water polo tournament at the 2022 World Aquatics Championships was held from 21 June to 3 July 2022 in Budapest, Hungary. This was the 19th time that the men's water polo tournament has been played since the first edition in 1973.

Spain won their third title with a win over Italy, while Greece beat Croatia to win the bronze medal.

Qualification

Russia was excluded due to the 2022 Russian invasion of Ukraine.

Draw
The draw was held on 12 April 2022.

Seeding
The pots were determined as follow.

 Pot 1: the 4 semifinalist of the Olympic Games
 Pot 2: the 2 finalists of the World League, Europe Qualifier 1 and America Qualifier 1
 Pot 3: Europe Qualifier 2, Europe Qualifier 3, Oceania Qualifier 1, America Qualifier 2
 Pot 4: Africa Qualifier 1, Asia Qualifier 1, Asia Qualifier 2, Europe Qualifier 4.

The draw resulted in the following groups:

Preliminary round

Group A

Group B

Group C

Group D

Knockout stage

Bracket
Championship bracket

5th place bracket

9th place bracket

13th place bracket

Playoffs

Quarterfinals

13–15th place semifinals

9–12th place semifinals

5–8th place semifinals

Semifinals

13th place game

Eleventh place game

Ninth place game

Seventh place game

Fifth place game

Third place game

Final

Final ranking

Medalists

Awards and statistics

Top goalscorers

Awards
The awards were announced on 3 July 2022.

Notes

References

External links
  19th FINA World Championships Budapest 2022 FINA Water Polo website
 Water polo at the 2022 World Championships – Men's tournament total-waterpolo.com
 Men Water Polo XIX World Championship 2022 Budapest, Hungary www.todor66.com

2022
Men